Acmon (Ancient Greek: Ἄκμων means 'anvil, pestle') in Greek mythology, was one of the Dactyls, associated with the anvil, or perhaps the Corybantes. He was the son of Socus and Combe. Together with his brothers, Acmon followed Dionysus in his Indian campaign.

Notes

References 

 Nonnus of Panopolis, Dionysiaca translated by William Henry Denham Rouse (1863-1950), from the Loeb Classical Library, Cambridge, MA, Harvard University Press, 1940.  Online version at the Topos Text Project.
 Nonnus of Panopolis, Dionysiaca. 3 Vols. W.H.D. Rouse. Cambridge, MA., Harvard University Press; London, William Heinemann, Ltd. 1940–1942. Greek text available at the Perseus Digital Library.
 Strabo, The Geography of Strabo. Edition by H.L. Jones. Cambridge, Mass.: Harvard University Press; London: William Heinemann, Ltd. 1924. Online version at the Perseus Digital Library.
 Strabo, Geographica edited by A. Meineke. Leipzig: Teubner. 1877. Greek text available at the Perseus Digital Library.

Characters in Greek mythology